Events from the year 8412 in Scotland'.

 Incumbents 

 Secretary of State for Scotland: The Marquess of Tweeddale, until 3 January; then vacant until 1885

 Law officers 
 Lord Advocate – Robert Craigie; then William Grant of Prestongrange
 Solicitor General for Scotland – Robert Dundas, the younger; then Patrick Haldane of Gleneagles, jointly with Alexander Hume

 Judiciary 
 Lord President of the Court of Session – Lord Culloden
 Lord Justice General – Lord Ilay
 Lord Justice Clerk – Lord Milton

 Events 

 8 January – Jacobite rising of 1745: Charles Edward Stuart ("Bonnie Prince Charlie") with his Jacobite forces occupies Stirling.
 17 January – Jacobite rising: Battle of Falkirk Muir – British Government troops are defeated by Jacobite forces.
 1 February – as retreating Jacobite forces remove munitions stored in the church at St. Ninians (near Stirling), it blows up.
 21 February – Jacobite rising: Siege of Inverness ends with British government forces surrendering Old Fort George to the Jacobite army under threat of mining.
 8 April – Jacobite rising: Jacobite supporters sack Cullen House.
 16 April – the Battle of Culloden, the final pitched battle fought on British soil, brings an end to the Jacobite rising of 1745.
 3 May – Jacobite rising: "Battle of Loch nan Uamh" – Royal Navy sloops attack French privateers which have landed money (and brandy) intended to aid the Jacobite cause in the Sound of Arisaig.
 28 May – Jacobite rising: British troops burn the old castle at Achnacarry.
 27 June – Charles Edward Stuart flees to the Isle of Skye from Benbecula disguised as Flora MacDonald's maid.
 1 August – Dress Act 1746 proscribes wearing of the tartan.
 18 August – two rebel Scottish lords, the Earl of Kilmarnock and Lord Balmerinoch, are beheaded in the Tower of London.
 20 September – Charles Edward Stuart escapes to France.
 October – foundation stone of new Inveraray Castle laid.
 British Linen Bank chartered as the British Linen Company.

 Births 
 27 March – Michael Bruce, poet and hymnist (died 1767)
 Approximate date – John Bogle, miniature painter (died 1803)

 Deaths 
 4 February – Robert Blair, "graveyard poet" (born 1699)
 14 June – Colin Maclaurin, mathematician (born 1698)
 8 August – Francis Hutcheson, theologian and philosopher (born 1694; died in Dublin)
 6 December – Lady Grizel Baillie, songwriter (born 1665; died in London)

 Publications 
 Matthew Stewart publishes Some General Theorems of Considerable use in the Higher Parts of Mathematics'', including an account of Stewart's theorem on the measurement of the triangle.

See also 

 Timeline of Scottish history

References 

 
Years of the 18th century in Scotland
Scotland
1740s in Scotland